In art history, the High Renaissance was a short period of the most exceptional artistic production in the Italian states, particularly Rome, capital of the Papal States, and in Florence, during the Italian Renaissance. Most art historians state that the High Renaissance started around 1495 or 1500 and ended in 1520 with the death of Raphael, although some say the High Renaissance ended about 1525, or in 1527 with the Sack of Rome by the army of Charles V, Holy Roman Emperor, or about 1530. The best-known exponents of painting, sculpture and architecture of the High Renaissance include Leonardo da Vinci, Michelangelo, Raphael, and Bramante. In recent years, the use of the term has been frequently criticized by some academic art historians for oversimplifying artistic developments, ignoring historical context, and focusing only on a few iconic works.

Origin of term
The art historian Jill Burke was the first to trace the historical origins of the term High Renaissance. It was first coined in German by Jacob Burckhardt in German (Hochrenaissance) in 1855 and has its origins in the "High Style" of painting and sculpture of the time period around the early 16th century described by Johann Joachim Winckelmann in 1764.  Extending the general rubric of Renaissance culture, the visual arts of the High Renaissance were marked by a renewed emphasis upon the classical tradition, the expansion of networks of patronage, and a gradual attenuation of figural forms into the style later termed Mannerism.

Time period
Alexander Raunch in The Art of the High Renaissance and Mannerism in Rome and Central Italy, 2007, states the High Renaissance began in 1490, while Marilyn Stokstad in Art History, 2008, states it began in the 1490s. Frederick Hartt states that Leonardo's The Last Supper, the painting of which began in 1495 and concluded in 1498, makes a complete break with the Early Renaissance and created the world in which Michelangelo and Raphael worked, while Christoph Luitpold Frommel, in his 2012 article "Bramante and the Origins of the High Renaissance," states The Last Supper is the first High Renaissance work but adds that the peak period of the High Renaissance was actually 1505 to 1513. David Piper in The Illustrated History of Art, 1991, also cites The Last Supper writing the work announced the High Renaissance and was one of the most influential paintings of the High Renaissance, but contradictorily states that the High Renaissance began just after 1500.  Burchkardt stated the High Renaissance started at the close of the 15th century, while Franz Kugler, who wrote the first "modern" survey text, Handbook of Art History in 1841, and Hugh Honour and John Fleming in The Visual Arts: A History, 2009, state the High Renaissance started at the beginning of the 16th century.  Another seminal work of art which was created in the 1495–1500 timeframe was Michelangelo's Pietà, housed in St. Peter's Basilica, Vatican City, which was executed in 1498–99.

In contrast to most of the other art historians, Manfred Wurdram, in Masterpieces of Western Art, 2007, actually states that the dawn of the High Renaissance was heralded by Leonardo's Adoration of the Magi of 1481, for which only the underpainting was completed.

As far as the end of the High Renaissance is concerned Hartt, Frommel, Piper, Wundrum, and Winkelman all state that the High Renaissance ended in 1520 with the death of Raphael.  Honour and Fleming stated the High Renaissance was the first quarter of the 16th century meaning it would have ended in 1525.  By contrast, Luigi Lanzi, in his History of Italian Painting, 1795–96, stated it ended with the Sack of Rome in 1527, when several artists were killed and many other dispersed from Rome, and Stokstad agrees. Raunch asserts that 1530 has been considered to be the end of the High Renaissance. Hartt adds that 1520 to 1530 was a transition period between the High Renaissance and Mannerism. Traditionally, the end of the High Renaissance in Florence is seen as marked by the end of the Republic of Florence and the beginning of the Duchy of Florence in 1532.

Architecture

High Renaissance style in architecture conventionally begins with Donato Bramante, whose Tempietto at S. Pietro in Montorio at Rome was begun in 1510. The Tempietto, signifies a full-scale revival of ancient Roman commemorative architecture. David Watkin writes that the Tempietto, like Raphael's works in the Vatican (1509–11), "is an attempt at reconciling Christian and humanist ideals".

Painting

The High Renaissance of painting was the culmination of the varied means of expression and various advances in painting technique, such as linear perspective, the realistic depiction of both physical  and psychological features, and the manipulation of light and darkness, including tone contrast, sfumato (softening the transition between colours) and chiaroscuro (contrast between light and dark), in a single unifying style which expressed total compositional order, balance and harmony. In particular, the individual parts of the painting had a complex but balanced and well-knit relationship to the whole. 

Painting of the High Renaissance is considered to be the absolute zenith of western painting and achieved the balancing and reconciliation, in harmony, of contradictory and seemingly mutually exclusive artistic positions, such as real versus ideal, movement versus rest, freedom versus law, space versus plane, and line versus colour.  The High Renaissance was traditionally viewed as a great explosion of creative genius, following a model of art history first proposed by the Florentine Giorgio Vasari.

The paintings in the Vatican by Michelangelo and Raphael are said by some scholars such as Stephen Freedberg to represent the culmination of High Renaissance style in painting, because of the ambitious scale of these works, coupled with the complexity of their composition, closely observed human figures, and pointed iconographic and decorative references to classical antiquity, can be viewed as emblematic of the High Renaissance.

Even relatively minor painters of the period, such as Fra Bartolomeo and Mariotto Albertinelli, produced works that are still lauded for the harmony of their design and their technique. The elongated proportions and exaggerated poses in the late works of Michelangelo, Andrea del Sarto and Correggio prefigure so-called Mannerism, as the style of the later Renaissance is referred to in art history.

The serene mood and luminous colours of paintings by Giorgione and early Titian exemplify High Renaissance style as practiced in Venice. Other recognizable pieces of this period include Leonardo da Vinci's Mona Lisa and Raphael's The School of Athens. Raphael's fresco, set beneath an arch, is a virtuoso work of perspective, composition and disegno.

In more recent years, art historians have characterised the High Renaissance as a movement as opposed to a period, one amongst several different experimental attitudes towards art in the late fifteenth and early sixteenth century. This movement is variously characterised as conservative, as reflecting new attitudes towards beauty, a deliberate process of synthesising eclectic models, linked to fashions in literary culture, and reflecting new preoccupations with interpretation and meaning .

Sculpture
High Renaissance sculpture, as exemplified by Michelangelo's Pietà and the iconic David, is characterized by an "ideal" balance between stillness and movement. High Renaissance sculpture was normally commissioned by the public and the state, this becoming more popular for sculpture is an expensive art form. Sculpture was often used to decorate or embellish architecture, normally within courtyards where others were able to study and admire the commissioned art work. Wealthy individuals like cardinals, rulers, and bankers were the more likely private patrons along with very wealthy families; Pope Julius II also patronized many artists. During the High Renaissance there was the development of small scale statuettes for private patrons, the creation of busts and tombs also developing. The subject matter related to sculpture was mostly religious but also with a significant strand of classical individuals in the form of tomb sculpture and paintings as well as ceilings of cathedrals.

References

External links

Toward The High Renaissance at Smarthistory

.
Art movements in Europe
Italian art movements
Italian Renaissance